Denis Allen is a singer/songwriter based in County Limerick, Ireland. He wrote and sang the song "Limerick You're A Lady" which went to number one in Ireland in 1979 for several weeks and stayed in the chart for about a year. It has since been recorded by over forty different artists.

Discography
Limerick You're a Lady
Late Starters in Love with Denis Carey
Shannon River with Denis Carey
featured on: Coming Home Joseph Ruane (composer); Mick Ryan (singer)

References
 Limerick County Council
 Imdb profile
 Business Limerick Interview

20th-century Irish male singers
Musicians from County Limerick
Year of birth missing (living people)
Living people